Ripa is the 12th  of Rome, identified by the initials R. XII, and it is located in the Municipio I.

History 
The borough has always been urbanized, although not intensively, since the Ancient Rome: at that time, the area included three regiones, Circus Maximus, Piscina Publica and Aventinus.

As of 4th century, the bank of the River Tiber in the rione was called Ripa Graeca, after a Greek community that settled there and increased during the following centuries, particularly in 8th century, when the area was inhabited by Greek and Latin people escaped from the iconoclastic persecutions led by Leo III the Isaurian.

During the Middle Ages, the northern part of the rione remained unpopulated, with the only exceptions of some fortified monastery and a baronial castle, the Rocca Savella.

Geography 
Initially the rione was ampler and included other portions of the city, that were detached in 1921 in order to establish two more rioni, San Saba and Testaccio.

Boundaries
Ripa borders northward with Regola (R. VII), whose border is defined by a stretch of the Tiber near the Tiber Island, between Ponte Garibaldi and Ponte Fabricio; as well as with Sant'Angelo (R. XI), from which is separated by Ponte Fabricio itself, by Lungotevere dei Pierleoni and by Via del Foro Olitorio. To the northeast, it also borders with Campitelli (R. X), from which is separated by Vico Jugario, Piazza della Consolazione, Via dei Fienili, Via di San Teodoro, Via dei Cerchi and Piazza di Porta Capena.

Eastward, the rione shares a short border with Celio (R. XIX), from which is separated by Piazza di Porta Capena.

To the south, Ripa borders with San Saba (R. XXI), whose boundary is outlined by Viale Aventino, Piazza Albania, Viale Manlio Gelsomini and Largo Manlio Gelsomini; and with Testaccio (R. XX), from which is separated by Largo Manlio Gelsomini, Via Marmorata and Piazza dell'Emporio.

Westward, Ripa is separated from Trastevere (R. XIII) by the stretch of the Tiber between Ponte Sublicio and Ponte Garibaldi.

Places of interest

Archaeological sites
 Remains of the Forum Boarium
 Circus Maximus
 Temple of Hercules Victor

Churches 

 San Vincenzo de Paoli all'Aventino
 Sant'Omobono
 Santa Prisca
 Santa Sabina
 Santi Bonifacio e Alessio
 Sant'Anselmo all'Aventino
 Santa Maria del Priorato
 San Giorgio in Velabro
 San Giovanni Battista Decollato
 Sant'Eligio dei Ferrari
 Santa Maria in Cosmedin
 San Bartolomeo all'Isola
 San Giovanni Calibita

Roads and squares 

 Piazza Albania
 Piazza Bocca della Verità

Other 
 Villa del Priorato di Malta
 Giardino degli Aranci

External links

 01
Rioni of Rome